Uranquinty is a closed railway station on the Main South railway line in New South Wales, Australia. The station opened in 1880, initially as Sandy Creek. The station consisted of a single platform with a substantial weatherboard station building and signal box. The platform buildings were demolished in the 1980s and only the platform and a replacement brick signalling facility remain. Passenger trains no longer stop at the station.

References

Disused regional railway stations in New South Wales
Railway stations in Australia opened in 1880
Main Southern railway line, New South Wales